USS Nemesis (SP-343) was a patrol vessel that served in the United States Navy from 1917 to 1918.
 
Nemesis was built as a private motorboat of the same name in 1896 by G. Smith at Patchogue, Long Island, New York. On 25 May 1917, the U.S. Navy acquired her under a free lease from her owner, W. L. Suyden of Else Point, Long Island, New York, for use as a patrol boat during World War I. She was placed in service as USS Nemesis (SP-343) on 7 June 1917.

Assigned to the 3rd Naval District, Nemesis served on patrol duties in the New York City area through the end of World War I. The Navy returned her to her owner on 14 December 1918.

References
 
 NavSource Online: Section Patrol Craft Photo Archive: Nemesis (SP 343)

Patrol vessels of the United States Navy
World War I patrol vessels of the United States
Ships built in New York (state)
1896 ships